Sebastiania dimorphocalyx is a species of flowering plant in the family Euphorbiaceae. It was described in 1874. It is native to Minas Gerais, Brazil.

Description 
It is a shrub, or a tree.

Ecology 
Sebastiania dimorphocalyx primarily grows in the seasonally dry tropical biome of Brazil.

Conservation 
Only two occurrences of this species have been documented.

References

Plants described in 1874
Flora of Brazil
Endemic flora of Brazil
dimorphocalyx
Taxa named by Johannes Müller Argoviensis